Akhtaruzzaman is a Bangladeshi politician. He is a freedom fighter of the Liberation war of Bangladesh in 1971. He is the former Member of Parliament from Kishoreganj-2.

Career
Akhtaruzzaman was elected to parliament from Kishoreganj-2 as a Bangladesh Nationalist Party (BNP) candidate in 1991 and 1996. He is retired major of Bangladesh Army. He was suspended from BNP after planning to return to the parliament of Bangladesh against the wishes of his party. BNP was then the opposition Party of Bangladesh and was boycotting parliament. In February 2022, Ranjan was dismissed from BNP for doing activities against the party.

Ranjan is the chairman of Gachihata Aquaculture Farms Ltd, which was listed on the stock market in 1998.

References

Bangladesh Nationalist Party politicians
Living people
5th Jatiya Sangsad members
6th Jatiya Sangsad members
7th Jatiya Sangsad members
Bangladesh Army officers
Year of birth missing (living people)